Aýterek Günterek may refer to:

Aýterek Günterek (game)
"Aýterek Günterek", a song by Mähri Pirgulyýewa